Kenshokai RedHearts is a women's volleyball team based in Yoshinogawa city & Tokushima city, Tokushima, Japan.
It plays in V.Challenge League. The club was founded in 2004. The owner of the team is Kenshokai-group Social welfare Corporation (健祥会).

History
It was founded in 2004.
It promoted to V.Challenge League in 2005.
In June 2011, it participated in the 2011 Asian Women's Club Volleyball Championship.

Honours
V.Challenge League
Champion(1) - 2008

League results

Current squad
As of November 2011
 1    Yumie Taniguchi (Head coach)
 4    Rio Tsuno
 5    Hitomi Nagano
 6    Hiromi Hagiuda
 7    Yukiko Tamaki
 10  Aya Jobetto
 11  Naoko Matsuda
 12  Yuki Nagano
 15  Hitomi Takizawa

Former players
Machiko Muramoto
Ai Kitashima
Hiroko Kido
Yuuki Sakai
Aki Sonoda
 Rie Iwamoto
 Hideko Misaki
 Yukiko Tamaki
 Akika Hattori
 Megumi Takahashi
 Tomomi Fukuhara
 Yukiko Uchida

See also
 Kenshokai-Group (ja)

External links
 Kenshokai-Group Official Website

Japanese volleyball teams